Anthony Aquino (born August 1, 1982) is a retired Canadian-born Italian professional ice hockey player. He last played for the Odense Bulldogs, and Rungsted Seier Capital  professional ice hockey teams in Denmark, of the top Danish league AL-Bank Ligaen, renamed Metalligaen.  He was a 3rd round selection,  92nd overall, of the Dallas Stars at the 2001 NHL Entry Draft.

Early life

Aquino began his early career playing minor hockey with the Toronto Red Wings organization of the Greater Toronto Hockey League. In 1996, they went on to win The World Cup, at The Quebec International Pee-Wee Hockey Tournament.

In 1999 Aquino was drafted round 10 #208 overall by Owen Sound Platers in the Ontario Hockey League (OHL) Priority Draft,  but chose not to play in the OHL so as to preserve his American college eligibility. Instead, he spent two seasons playing in the OPJHL, and in 1999 competed in Canada's National Junior A Championship Royal Bank Cup where he was awarded Most Sportsmanlike Player.

Playing career

Merrimack College

At 17, Aquino attended Merrimack College from 1999 to 2002 on full hockey scholarship. He led the team in goals scored in each of his three seasons at Merrimack. In 110 career games at Merrimack over three seasons, Aquino totaled 115 points on 56 goals and 59 assists.

Aquino was awarded NCAA (Hockey East) All-Rookie Team following his freshman year in 1999–2000. He was awarded NCAA (Hockey East) Second All-Star Team  the following two years, as well as NCAA (New England) D1 All-Stars 2001–2002.

He was drafted in the 3rd round of the 2001 NHL Entry Draft (92nd overall) by the Dallas Stars. Aquino is Merrimack's 2nd highest draft pick of all-time.

In 2002, he was promoted to captain and became the 9th player to ever reach the mark of 100 career points for Merrimack since the program joined Hockey East in 1988.  For nine years, Aquino held the record of most points scored over any other Merrimack player, from his 2001–02 season; as well as most points per game average.

Merrimack unveiled the All-Decade Team in 2010, naming Aquino as their leading forward. An all-rookie and all-Hockey East selection, he was the last Warrior to net 40 points until 2010.

Professional

At Merrimack College, Anthony Aquino was a member of the Hockey East All-Rookie Team as a 17-year-old freshman, a Hockey East Second Team All-Star his sophomore season, and led Merrimack in scoring for the second straight season his junior season. 
Prior to his senior season, and as senior caption, Aquino received an invitation from the Dallas Stars, who drafted him in the third round in 2001, to participate in both the team's rookie development camp and full-squad training camp on a tryout basis, he decided to accept looking to join the team or play with Oshawa Generals of the OHL for one year.

At the end of August, a U.S. federal court judge granted a preliminary injunction allowing Aquino to play in the OHL as a 20-year-old 'overeager'. The injunction was granted, but the OHL appealed, forcing Aquino to make a decision between returning to Merrimack or playing in the OHL.  Aquino filed a lawsuit against the OHL in an attempt to follow in the footsteps of Mike Van Ryn. Aquino joined the Oshawa Generals Sept. 25, 2002, and played 14 games before the OHL ruled him ineligible on Nov. 5. 
He scored 10 goals and had nine assists in 14 games with Oshawa of the Ontario Hockey League.

Aquino refused to sign with Dallas and forced a trade. On March 11, 2003, The Atlanta Thrashers acquired Aquino, the twenty-year-old right wing, from the Dallas Stars for a sixth-round draft pick.

The Atlanta Thrashers then signed Aquino and sent him to the Chicago Wolves of the AHL.

Atlanta assigned Aquino to the Chicago Wolves for five games to end the 2002–03 season. He then played almost all of the 2003–04 season for the Thrashers ECHL affiliate, the Gwinnett Gladiators. During the 2004 NHL lockout, Aquino was bought out of his contract by the Thrashers and went to play in Europe.

Since 2004 he has played in Europe, primarily in the Deutsche Eishockey Liga, the Italian Serie A and the Danish AL-Bank Ligaen.

International

After moving to Italy, Aquino gained Italian citizenship. He played for the Italian men's national ice hockey team in their attempt to qualify for the 2010 Olympics, in Riga, Latvia.

Retirement
Aquino officially retired from hockey on January 21, 2016. Aquino had completed his degree from the University of Southern Denmark with a M.Sc. in Economics and Business Administration; he now works in Finance.

Personal life

Anthony has a brother Luciano Aquino and sister, and lives in Toronto with his wife and daughter.

Career statistics

Regular season and playoffs

International

Awards and honors

References

External links

1982 births
Adler Mannheim players
Canadian expatriate ice hockey players in Germany
Canadian expatriate ice hockey players in Sweden
Canadian ice hockey right wingers
Chicago Wolves players
Dallas Stars draft picks
Gwinnett Gladiators players
Ice hockey people from Ontario
IFK Arboga IK players
Italian ice hockey players
Living people
Merrimack Warriors men's ice hockey players
Oshawa Generals players
Sportspeople from Mississauga
University of Southern Denmark alumni